Cy is a masculine given name, often a short form (hypocorism) of Cyril, Cyrus or Seymour, and a nickname. It may refer to:

In arts and entertainment
 Cy Chadwick (born 1969), English actor, director, producer and presenter
 Seymour Cy Coben (1919–2006), American songwriter
 Cy Coleman (1929–2004), American composer, songwriter and jazz pianist born Seymour Kaufman
 Cyril Cy Endfield (1914–1995), American screenwriter, film and theatre director, author, magician and inventor
 Seymour Cy Feuer (1911–2006), American theatre producer, director, composer and musician
 Cy Gavin (born 1985), American artist
 Cyril Cy Grant (1919–2010), Guyanese actor, musician, writer and poet
 Cyrus Cy Hungerford (1889–1983), American editorial cartoonist
 Cyrus Cy Kendall (1898–1953), American actor
 Cyril Cy Laurie (1926–2002), English jazz clarinetist and bandleader
 Seymour Cy Leslie (1922–2008), founder of Pickwick Records and first president and founder of MGM/UA Home Entertainment Group
 Seymour Cy Schindell (1907–1948), American actor
 Cyril Cy Touff (1927–2003), American jazz bass trumpeter
 Edwin Cy Twombly, Jr. (1928–2011), American painter, sculptor and photographer
 Cyril Cy Walter (1915–1968), American café society pianist

Politicians
 Richard Cy LeBlanc (born 1955), Canadian politician
 Cyril Sherwood (1915–1996), Canadian politician
 Cy Thao (born 1972), Laotian-born American politician

In sport

Baseball
 Cecilio Cy Acosta (born 1946), Mexican former Major League Baseball pitcher
 Frederick Cy Alberts (1882–1917), American Major League Baseball pitcher in 1910
 Eros Cy Barger (1885–1964), American Major League Baseball pitcher
 Clytus Cy Bentley (1850–1873), American Major League Baseball pitcher
 Darrell Cy Blanton (1908–1945), American Major League Baseball pitcher
 Seymour Cy Block (1919–2004), American Major League Baseball player
 Cyril Cy Buker (1918–2011), American Major League Baseball pitcher in 1945
 Arthur Cy Fried (1897–1970), American Major League Baseball pitcher in 1920
 William Cy Moore (1905–1972), American Major League Baseball pitcher
 Harry Cy Morgan (1878–1962), American Major League Baseball pitcher
 Cyril Cy Morgan (1920s pitcher) (1895–1946), American Major League Baseball pitcher
 Ralph Cy Perkins (1896–1963), American Major League Baseball player, coach and manager
 Kenneth Cy Rheam (1893–1947), American baseball player
 James Cy Seymour (1872–1919), American Major League Baseball player and general manager and vice president of the Cleveland Indians
 Cyril Cy Slapnicka (1886–1979), American Major League Baseball pitcher and executive
 Edwin Cy Twombly (baseball) (1897–1974), American Major League Baseball pitcher in 1921
 Henry Cy Vorhees (1874–1910), American Major League Baseball pitcher in 1902
 Wallace Cy Warmoth (1893–1957), American Major League Baseball pitcher
 Frederick Cy Williams (1887–1974), American Major League Baseball player
 Ceylon Cy Wright (1893–1947), American Major League Baseball player in 1916
 Denton Cy Young (1867–1955), American Major League Baseball Hall-of-Fame pitcher

Hockey
 Cyril Cy Denneny (1891–1970), Canadian National Hockey League player
 Cyril Cy Thomas (1926–2009), Welsh-born National Hockey League player
 Marvin Wentworth (1904–1982), Canadian National Hockey League player

Other sports
 Cy Alexander (born 1953), American college basketball head coach
 Charles Cy Casper (1912–1968), American National Football League player
 Cy Marshall (1902–1974), American race car driver
 Jack Cy McClairen (1931–2020), American former National Football League player and college football and basketball head coach
 Shirley Cy Wentworth (American football) (1904–1986), American National Football League player
 Burton Cy Williams (American football) (1903–1965), American Football League and National Football League player
 Cy Young (athlete) (1928–2017), American javelin thrower, 1952 Olympic champion
 Harry Young (American football) (1893–1977), American college football and basketball player and head coach, and sprinter, member of the College Football Hall of Fame

In other fields
 Salim L. Lewis (1908–1978), American business executive, managing partner of Bear, Stearns & Company

Masculine given names
Hypocorisms
Lists of people by nickname